The Assistant Secretary of the Treasury for Legislative Affairs is the head of the Office of Legislative Affairs in the United States Department of the Treasury. The role may be signated as Deputy Under Secretary of the Treasury for Legislative Affairs. The office "advises the Secretary on congressional relations matters in order to assist in the formulation of policy and determining the overall direction of the Department. [It] serves as the principal contact and coordinator for all Department interaction with the Congress and the Congressional Relations offices in the White House and other Departments and agencies."

The position was created on May 18, 1972 during the Nixon administration, with the original title of Deputy Under Secretary for Congressional Relations. The title was changed to Deputy Under Secretary for Legislative Affairs before the second officeholder was nominated.

According to U.S. statute, there are ten Assistant Secretaries of the Treasury appointed by the President of the United States with the advice and consent of the United States Senate. The Assistant Secretary of the Treasury for Legislative Affairs reports directly to the United States Secretary of the Treasury and the United States Deputy Secretary of the Treasury.

The office is currently run by Jonathan Davidson.

List of Assistant Secretaries of the Treasury for Legislative Affairs

See also
Assistant Secretary of the Treasury

References